Finchley and Golders Green is a constituency created in 1997 represented in the House of Commons of the UK Parliament. The current MP is Mike Freer of the Conservative Party, who has held the seat since 2010.

Boundaries 

1997–2010: The London Borough of Barnet wards of Childs Hill, East Finchley, Finchley, Garden Suburb, Golders Green, St Paul's, and Woodhouse.

2010–present: As above; less St Paul's, plus West Finchley and replacing Finchley with Finchley Church End.

The constituency covers Finchley, Golders Green, Childs Hill, Temple Fortune and Hampstead Garden Suburb in the London Borough of Barnet. It was created in 1997 largely replacing the abolished constituency of Finchley—plus major parts of abolished Hendon South, less some of its wards transferred to the Chipping Barnet seat which covers Barnet. Specifically the creation saw the removal of Friern Barnet and the addition of Golders Green, Childs Hill and Hampstead Garden Suburb.

2007 boundary review
Under a review of parliamentary representation, and as a consequence of changes to ward boundaries, the Boundary Commission for England recommended in a boundary report published in 2007 that:
parts of Golders Green ward and Finchley Church End ward be transferred from Hendon
part of Woodhouse ward be transferred from Chipping Barnet; 
parts of Mill Hill ward and Coppetts ward be transferred to Hendon and Chipping Barnet respectively.

These changes took effect at the 2010 general election.

2023 boundary review
The revised proposals by the Boundary Commission are for a Finchley and Golders Green constituency covering the wards of Childs Hill, Cricklewood, East Finchley, Garden Suburb, Golders Green, West Finchley and Woodhouse. The Boundary Commission will submit its final report and recommendations to Parliament on 1 July 2023.

History
Most of this zone was in Finchley (abolished), created in 1918, most famously represented by former Conservative Prime Minister Margaret Thatcher from 1959 to 1992; reshaping meant that she never re-won as large a majority as in 1959, and was re-elected by a 10 per cent margin in 1974. She nonetheless won 8,000 and 9,000 majorities, 20 per cent margins, at the three general elections throughout her premiership.

Since the nominal result at the 1992 general election, and officially from its creation, the seat has been a national bellwether.

The 2015 result gave the seat the 65th-most marginal majority of the Conservative Party's 331 seats by percentage of majority.

The 2019 result saw Labour's share of the vote decline by 19.6% as the party dropped to third place. This was the eighth-worst decline among the 630 Labour candidates. The Liberal Democrats, who came second in the seat for the first time, increased their vote share by 25.3%, the third-largest increase of their candidates. They were partly helped by the Green Party's choice to stand aside locally via the Unite to Remain electoral pact. Despite the Conservative share of the vote going down 3%, their majority quadrupled from 2017.

Constituency profile

The area is relatively green and hilly for London and has many tube stations.  Finchley and Golders Green were overwhelmingly built on in the first half of the 20th century when at the fringe of London.  The area has since the heyday of the railways had little industry or large headquarters of its own, the non-commuting economy being in public service, high street retail, leisure and hospitality, domestic/commercial premises tradespeople, plus home-based media, digital economy and arts workers. Commuters take in many people in the financial, medical and legal professions and some people ancillary to central London's diverse economy.

In southern parts of the London Borough of Barnet, private and one-family housing still exceeds the London average; houses tend to have gardens exceeding their footprint, yet there are also many older, subdivided, townhouses and shared or modest-size family flats. The proportion of social and assured or supported rental housing is lower than the London average. Most residents have quite high incomes largely to meet the cost of mortgages and rent, are very well educated, and middle-class – it retains many Labour Party supporters in East and West Finchley. Over 20% of residents are Jewish, the highest of any seat.

Members of Parliament 

According to Rallings and Thrasher, the boundary changes which came into force for the general election of 2010 meant that this seat notionally already had a Conservative majority, albeit a very small one.

Elections

Elections in the 2010s

Elections in the 2000s

Elections in the 1990s

See also 
 Finchley (UK Parliament constituency), approximate predecessor
 Hendon South (UK Parliament constituency), half of which was merged with Finchley
 List of parliamentary constituencies in London

Notes

References

External links 
Politics Resources (Election results from 1922 onwards)
Electoral Calculus (Election results from 1955 onwards)

Politics of the London Borough of Barnet
Parliamentary constituencies in London
Constituencies of the Parliament of the United Kingdom established in 1997
Finchley
Golders Green